Margaret Thompson Murdock (born August 25, 1942) is a nurse and former United States Army officer most widely known for her success in international shooting competitions, including a silver medal at the 1976 Summer Olympics.

Murdock is the first woman to win a medal in Shooting at the Summer Olympics and the first to win an individual open World Shooting Championship. In international competition Murdock set four individual world records and nine team world records.  She is a member of five halls of fame, including the USA Shooting Hall of Fame and the Kansas Sports Hall of Fame.

Early years

Margaret L. Thompson was born August 25, 1942 in Topeka, Kansas.  While growing up during the 1950s, she learned how to shoot by following her father to the rifle range.

She graduated from Hayden High School,  then attended Kansas State University, where she competed on the men's rifle team  winning two Big Eight Conference championships and became the university's first female student to earn a varsity letter.  The team practiced with 5th Army Rifle Team at Fort Riley, which led to a four-year stint in the U.S. Army, where she was assigned as a shooting instructor at Fort Benning, eventually achieving the rank of major.

Competitions
Murdock was the 1966 World Champion in Women's Standard Rifle. In 1967 she won two gold medals in small-bore rifle at the Pan American Games and set a world record, for men or women, in the kneeling rifle shooting.

Murdock narrowly missed qualifying for the 1968 games in Mexico City. She became the first woman ever on the U.S. Olympic shooting team (in 1976) and the first woman to win a medal in shooting at the Olympic Games. She won a silver medal that year, after tying with Lanny Bassham, the U.S. team captain. Olympic rules forbade a shoot-off, which Bassham had requested. During the national anthem, Bassham pulled Murdock up to stand with him on the gold medal spot at the podium. In 1992 she was named to the U.S. International Shooting Hall of Fame.

Post-competition career
Murdock retired from competitive shooting at age 35, becoming a registered nurse, specializing in anesthesia.

References

1942 births
Living people
American nurses
American women nurses
American anesthesiologists
American military Olympians
Olympic silver medalists for the United States in shooting
Shooters at the 1976 Summer Olympics
Female United States Army officers
Kansas State Wildcats rifle shooters
Sportspeople from Topeka, Kansas
Medalists at the 1976 Summer Olympics
American female sport shooters
Pan American Games medalists in shooting
Pan American Games gold medalists for the United States
Shooters at the 1967 Pan American Games
Medalists at the 1967 Pan American Games
21st-century American women